The Park to Playa Trail in Los Angeles County, California is a  pedestrian and bicycle route that connects the Baldwin Hills parklands to the Pacific Ocean (Playa is beach in Spanish). According to the Los Angeles Times, “Good views of L.A. are guaranteed on the dirt-and-paved track from Baldwin Hills to Playa del Rey.”

Segments
Various aspects of the trail have existed for decades but the trail was considered “complete” when the bridge over La Cienega Blvd. was opened in 2020.

Park to Playa Trail segments (roughly east to west):

See also
List of Los Angeles bike paths
 Coastal Bike Trail
 Expo Line Bikeway
 Culver Boulevard Median Bike Path
 Baldwin Hills (mountain range)
 Backbone Trail

References

External links
 Park to Playa trail maps by segment, from LA County (PDF) - w elevation changes
 McNary, Sharon; Sanchez, Chava (2021-02-21). "LA's Park To Playa Trail: After 20 Years You Can Now Hike From Crenshaw To The Beach". LAist.com
 Perry, John (2021-03-17). “Park to Playa: Hiking across the Baldwin Hills”. Transiting Los Angeles

Parks in Los Angeles County, California
Bike paths in Los Angeles
Baldwin Hills (mountain range)
Hiking trails in California